The Rural Municipality of Star City No. 428 is a rural municipality (RM) in the Canadian province of Saskatchewan within Census Division No. 14 and  Division No. 4.

History 
The RM of Star City No. 428 incorporated as a rural municipality on January 1, 1913.

Geography

Communities and localities 
The following urban municipalities are surrounded by the RM.

Cities
 Melfort

Towns
 Star City

Villages
 Valparaiso

The following unincorporated communities are within the RM.

Localities
 Clements
 Naisberry
 Resource
 South Star

Demographics 

Attractions 
 Star City Heritage Museum
 Melfort & District Regional Park

Government 
The RM of Star City No. 428 is governed by an elected municipal council and an appointed administrator that meets on the second Tuesday of every month. The reeve of the RM is Robert Miller while its administrator is Levina Cronk. The RM's office is located in Star City.

Transportation 
 Saskatchewan Highway 3
 Saskatchewan Highway 6
 Saskatchewan Highway 681
 Saskatchewan Highway 776

See also 
List of rural municipalities in Saskatchewan

References 

Star City